Nhamo is a 2011 short film written and directed by Eunice Chiweshe Goldstein. It runs approximately eleven minutes and fifty seven seconds long. Countries of production are United States, South Africa and Zimbabwe. The film was nominated for Africa Movie Academy Awards Best Short Film.

Cast
 Thabo Nyaku as Musati
 Garion Dowds as Alden
 Kagiso Legoadi as Timbo
 Molefi Monaisa as Mutombo

References

External links 

2011 short films
2011 films
South African short films
2010s English-language films